The Bogomol'nyi–Prasad–Sommerfield bound (named after Evgeny Bogomolny, M.K. Prasad, and Charles Sommerfield) is a series of inequalities for solutions of partial differential equations depending on the homotopy class of the solution at infinity.  This set of inequalities is very useful for solving soliton equations. Often, by insisting that the bound be satisfied (called "saturated"), one can come up with a simpler set of partial differential equations to solve the Bogomolny equations. Solutions saturating the bound are called "BPS states" and play an important role in field theory and string theory.

Example

In a theory of non-abelian Yang–Mills–Higgs, the energy at a given time t is given by

where  is the covariant derivative of the Higgs field and V is the potential. If we assume that V is nonnegative and is zero only for the Higgs vacuum and that the Higgs field is in the adjoint representation, then, by virtue of the Yang–Mills Bianchi identity,

Therefore,

Saturation of the inequality is obtained when the Bogomolny equations are satisfied.

The other condition for saturation is that the Higgs mass and self-interaction are zero, which is the case in N=2 supersymmetric theories.

This quantity is the absolute value of the magnetic flux.

A slight generalization applying to dyons also exists. For that, the Higgs field needs to be a complex adjoint, not a real adjoint.

Supersymmetry
In supersymmetry, the BPS bound is saturated when half (or a quarter or an eighth) of the SUSY generators are unbroken. This happens when the mass is equal to the central extension, which is typically a topological charge.

In fact, most bosonic BPS bounds actually come from the bosonic sector of a supersymmetric theory and this explains their origin.

References

Partial differential equations
Quantum field theory
Solitons